The Maximum Black EP is an 11-track album by The Mooney Suzuki. It contains the 6 songs from the original EP and 5 unreleased bonus tracks. Some copies of the album come with a free sticker.

Track listing 
And Begin 1:30
I Say I Love You 1:59
My Dear Persephone 2:46
Half My Heart 3:47
Turn My Blue Sky Black 2:47
Love Is A Gentle Whip 2:49
These are the 6 original songs
Right On 2:36
Tell Me Why 2:40
This Lonely Land 2:34
You're Not There 2:49
I Can Only Give You Everything 2:30
These are the unreleased tracks

References 

2006 EPs